Globe (stylized as globe) is the debut studio album by Japanese band Globe. Released by Avex Trax on March 31, 1996, the album features the singles "Feel Like Dance", "Joy to the Love", "Sweet Pain", "Departures, and "Freedom". "Departures" sold over two million copies, becoming the second highest-selling single in Japan (behind Mr. Children's "Namonaki Uta").

The album hit No. 1 on Oricon's weekly albums chart. It sold over 4,136,000 copies and was certified as a 4 Million seller by the RIAJ.

Track listing

Charts
Weekly charts

Year-end charts

Certification

References

External links
 Official website
 
 

1996 debut albums
Japanese-language albums
Albums produced by Tetsuya Komuro
Avex Group albums